L'Abeille américaine, Journal Historique, Politique, et Litteraire à Philadelphie was an American French language newspaper, based in Philadelphia The weekly newspaper, published by A.J. Blocquerst, began publication in 1815. The founder of the newspaper, Jean Simon Chaudron, had escaped from Santo Domingo (Saint-Domingue).

See also 

 Francophonie
 French Louisiana

References

External links
 Le recueil des numéros de 1818
 Le rôle de la presse dans la constitution du littéraire au bas-Canada et au Brésil(UQUAM)
 1815 : les naufrages de l'Empire aux Amériques

1815 establishments in Pennsylvania
Defunct newspapers of Philadelphia
French-American culture in Pennsylvania
French-language newspapers published in the United States
Haitian-American culture in Pennsylvania
Non-English-language newspapers published in Pennsylvania
Publications established in 1815